is a Japanese professional footballer who plays for FC Gifu.

Career
He played 9 games for Kashiwa Reysol in 2009 as System Specially Designated Player during his last studying year in Juntendo University. After spending nearly six years playing for Reysol, he signed a five-year deal with Primeira Liga side Sporting CP on 29 June 2014.

Career statistics

Club
Updated to 19 December 2020.

1Includes Emperor's Cup.
2Includes J. League Cup.
3Includes AFC Champions League.
4Includes FIFA Club World Cup and Japanese Super Cup.

International

Honours
Kashiwa Reysol
J1 League: 2011
J2 League: 2010
Emperor's Cup: 2012
J.League Cup: 2013
Japanese Super Cup: 2012

Sporting
Taça de Portugal: 2014–15
Supertaça Cândido de Oliveira: 2015

Vissel Kobe
Emperor's Cup: 2019
Japanese Super Cup: 2020

References

External links
 
 

 
 Japan National Football Team Database
 
 Junya Tanaka at Kashiwa Reysol official site 
 Profile at Vissel Kobe
 
 Junya Tanaka – Yahoo! Japan competition record 

1987 births
Living people
Juntendo University alumni
Association football people from Tokyo
Japanese footballers
Japan international footballers
J1 League players
J2 League players
J3 League players
Primeira Liga players
Kashiwa Reysol players
Vissel Kobe players
FC Gifu players
Sporting CP footballers
Japanese expatriate footballers
Expatriate footballers in Portugal
Japanese expatriate sportspeople in Portugal
Association football forwards